Frey House is a historic home located at Palatine Bridge in Montgomery County, New York. It was built in 1808 and consists of a double-pile, center-hall-plan main block with a -story, stone kitchen wing added in 1882, and sun porch dated to 1931. Also on the property are a five-bay garage (c. 1930), 19th-century lime kiln, and the Frey family cemetery.

It was added to the National Register of Historic Places in 2002.

Gallery

References

External links

Houses on the National Register of Historic Places in New York (state)
Historic American Buildings Survey in New York (state)
Georgian architecture in New York (state)
Federal architecture in New York (state)
Houses completed in 1808
Houses in Montgomery County, New York
National Register of Historic Places in Montgomery County, New York
Lime kilns in the United States